Yaman is a Turkish male given name and it means redoubtable, stalwart, intelligent, efficient, strong.

Given name
 Yaman Candar,  founder of Candarid beylik in Anatolia in the late 13th century
 Yaman Okay (1951-1993), Turkish actor.

Surname
 Çağla Yaman (born 1981), Turkish handball player
 Fuat Yaman (born 1958), Turkish football coach
 Gamze Nur Yaman (born 1999), Turkish women's footballer
 İrem Yaman, Turkish female taekwondo practitioner
 Volkan Yaman (born 1982), German born Turkish professional football player

References

Turkish-language surnames
Turkish masculine given names